During the 1945–46 season, Hearts competed in the Southern League First Division, the Victory Cup, the Southern League Cup and the East of Scotland Shield.

Fixtures

Friendlies

East of Scotland Shield

Wilson Cup

Southern League Cup

Victory Cup

Southern League First Division

See also 
List of Heart of Midlothian F.C. seasons

References 

Statistical Record 45-46

External links 
Official Club website

Heart of Midlothian F.C. seasons
Heart of Midlothian